Beth Wallace is a fictional character from the NBC/DirecTV soap opera Passions. Beth was played by actress and former beauty pageant Kelli McCarty from August 23, 1999, until July 18, 2005, and from May 12 to July 14, 2006. The role was contract from October 14, 2002, until May 12, 2004.

Character history

Beth was the product of an adulterous liaison between Alistair Crane and Edna Wallace. Beth was born to Edna who may or may not have been married to Mr. Wallace. Beth assumes Wallace is her biological father until her true paternity was revealed in 2005. After Wallace died, Edna - a former Prostitute, returned to her former profession, despite a job as a server at the Crane mansion. Beth would be abused by the various men Edna enlisted. When Beth was young, she took her rage out on her pet gerbil, various school classmates, and finally her own mother - physically maiming her so she walked with a walker.

Beth was Luis's high school sweetheart and manages the Book Café. She is Sheridan's first female friend from Harmony and, when she and Luis date in 1999, they spend a lot of time with Hank and Sheridan, who are also dating. Sheridan and Luis find themselves spending more and more time together, which upsets both Hank and Beth when they learn their significant others are being duplicitous.

Beth is seldom seen for quite some time, until after Sheridan's body is found in the ocean. She and Luis become close again, and even become lovers, with Luis finally believing he could commit to her. Beth and Luis were looking forward to their future together when Sheridan returned to town going as Diana, with Luis's brother, Antonio. Sheridan soon regained her memory and Luis turned away from Beth once more.

When Sheridan's pregnancy is announced, Beth kidnaps her and keeps her in a basement while faking her own pregnancy. Luis, who had passed out after being drugged by Beth, had no reason to suspect he was not the father of a child he believed existed. Beth convinces Harmony doctors to lie for her and  "gives birth" to a healthy son, whom she and Luis name Marty. Not long after, Sheridan is found alive, but her child is presumed deceased. Luis grieves for the baby, and spends all of his time comforting or chasing Sheridan, spending little time with Beth and Marty.

Although Beth still loves Luis, she also grows very close to Marty, whom her mother is helping to raise. Sheridan becomes convinced Marty is her son and, after a DNA test proves Beth is the boy's mother, Beth realises she is Alistair Crane's daughter. After a second DNA test proves Sheridan is Marty's mother, Alistair helps Beth flee the country with Marty. Although Beth is upset to lose Luis, it is more important to her that she not be separated from Marty, whom she thinks of as her own child.

Luis finally catches up with Beth in Italy, while Sheridan is back in Harmony with her new husband, Chris. Luis watches as the train carrying Beth, Marty, and Alistair explodes, and returns to Harmony to tell Sheridan that her father, half-sister, and only child are dead. Although Beth never returned to the series, Alistair and Marty have both turned up alive.

Personality
When the character of Beth first appeared, she was kind, sympathetic and supportive. She acted as an advice-giver to Luis and Sheridan, although on separate occasions. It was known she had previously been in love with Luis, but Beth was not bitter about him moving on. After several appearances, Beth was absent for a time. When Beth was "reintroduced" a year or so later, her character was no longer sympathetic. Instead, she became a villain, primarily interested in stealing Luis away from Sheridan. For the remainder of Beth's appearances, she was implied to have psychotic tendencies ranging from kidnapping Sheridan to faking a pregnancy all the way to "birth".

References and footnotes

See also
 Crane family

External links

PS Online
Beth at Soap Central

Wallace, Beth
Wallace, Beth
Wallace, Beth
Wallace, Beth